The 1957 World Table Tennis Championships women's doubles was the 23rd edition of the women's doubles championship.
Lívia Mossóczy and Agnes Simon defeated Diane Rowe and Ann Haydon in the final by three sets to two.

Results

See also
List of World Table Tennis Championships medalists

References

-
1957 in women's table tennis